is a Japanese football player who plays for Ococias Kyoto AC.

Career
On 6 January 2020, Terada joined Ococias Kyoto AC.

Club statistics
Updated to 23 February 2018.

Team honours
AFC Champions League - 2008
J1 League - 2005
Emperor's Cup - 2008
J.League Cup - 2007

References

External links

Profile at Tochigi SC

1985 births
Living people
Association football people from Osaka Prefecture
People from Ibaraki, Osaka
Japanese footballers
J1 League players
J2 League players
Gamba Osaka players
Yokohama FC players
Tochigi SC players
Ococias Kyoto AC players
Association football midfielders